Guaíra is a municipality in São Paulo state in Brazil. The population is 41,040 (2020 est.) in an area of 1258 km2.

History 

In the northeastern region of São Paulo, between the Rio Grande, Pardo River and the Sapucaí River, in what was then called Nuporanga, Antônio Marques Garcia founded a town in the called "Corredeira," along the path to Santa dos Olhos D'Água (which is today known as Ipuã). A plot of land which was acquired November 12, 1901 for "Six-hundred thousand réis" was enlarged with lands donated by Joaquim Garcia Franco and Maria Sabino Alves Franco, resulting in a significantly sized area focused around a small settlement called "Corredeira of São Sebastião" in homage to the patron saint, later renamed "Corredeira do Bom Jardim" or simply "Corredeira."

It was named a "Distrito de Paz," (that is, was assigned a Justice of the Peace) with the name of Guaíra, by State Law n. 1144 on November 16, 1908, and a municipality by State Law n. 2328 on December 27, 1928. Installation as a municipality took place on May 18, 1929, and installation as a comarca on May 18, 1955. "Guaíra" is a toponym which can be translated as "running water."

 Patron Saint: Saint Sebastian

Geography 

 Topography: flat
 Rainfall: yearly average of 1,550 mm
 Winds predominantly from the Northwest
 Temperature:
 Maximum: 38 degrees Celsius
 Minimum: 6 degrees Celsius
 Median: 25 degrees Celsius

Hydrography 

 Rio Grande
 Sapucaí River
 Rio Pardo
 Ribeirão do Jardim

Highways 

 SP-345
 SP-425

Demographics 

Census data: 2000

Total population: 34,610

 Urban: 32.274
 Rural: 2,336
 Men: 17,412
 Women: 17, 198

Population density (inhabitants/km2): 27.50

Infant mortality to age 1 (per thousand): 8.24

Life expectancy (years): 75.93

Fertility rate (children per woman): 2.17

Literacy rate: 91.07%

Human Development Index: 0.822

 HDI-M GDP: 0.728
 HDI-M Life Expectancy: 0.849
 HDI-M Education: 0.888

(Source: IPEA)

Other measures 

 Number of voters in 2003: 25,231
 Date of founding: December 27, 1928
 Major industries: agriculture, husbandry, agribusiness
 Roads - 740 km
 Paved roads: 44 km
 Main tourist point: Lago Maracá

References

External links 
 Prefecture homepage (Portuguese)
 Homepage of courts (Portuguese)

Municipalities in São Paulo (state)